Winter Haven Christian School (WHCS) is a private Christian school located at 1700 Buckeye Loop Road NE in the City of Winter Haven, Florida.  The school currently serves grades pre-kindergarten three-year-olds through twelfth grade.

References

External links
Official Website

Christian schools in Florida
Educational institutions established in 1965
Private middle schools in Florida
Private elementary schools in Florida
Buildings and structures in Winter Haven, Florida
Schools in Polk County, Florida
1965 establishments in Florida